The Beezer Annual was the final name of the book that had been published every year since 1957, to tie in with the children's comic The Beezer. Forty-six were made over the years. Since they were traditionally published in the autumn and in time for Christmas, since 1965 they had the date of the following year on the cover. Before then no date was given.

The original title was 'The Beezer Book for Boys and Girls'. The 'for Boys and Girls' part was used rarely, however, and made its last appearance on the front of the 1966 annual. This annual also coincided with the introduction of the year to the front cover: this annual was called 'The Beezer Book for Boys and Girls 1966', while next year's was called 'The Beezer Book 1967'. This name continued, the year changing for each different annual, until the release of the 2003 book in 2002 when it was renamed to its final name, though the following year still appeared at the end.  The adult comic Viz parodied the Beezer Book's original title by calling its 2002 annual "Viz Annual 2002:  The Better Book for Boys and Girls", which featured one of its younger characters on the cover holding something representing a pornographic Beezer publication.

Although The Beezer comic's final issue occurred in 1993, the annual continued for another 9 years. The 2003 annual was the final one.

This information is necessary to identify older annuals which were not dated. Annuals were published the autumn before with the 1958 annual published Autumn 1957. Price is in shillings and (old) pence with one shilling equal to 5p :

 1958. Beezer characters climbing up steep stairway. Price 7/-
 1959. Beezer characters on head and shoulders. Stepladder-balloon-bicycle holding up letters of word "Beezer". Price 7/-
 1960. Head and shoulders of Baby Crockett. Price 7/-
 1961. Globe of the world wearing school cap and four stars, one in each corner. Price 7/6
 1962. Old Locomotive and carriage with Beezer characters inside. Price 7/6
 1963. Two pirates, each in the holes of the B of Beezer and airplanes at the top of cover. Price 7/6
 1964. Head and shoulders of man in uniform which is decorated with medals. Word Beezer on hat band. Price 7/6
 1965. Colonel Blink wearing a large drum on his chest and about to fall down an open manhole. Price 7/6
 1966. Ginger blowing bubbles out of a pipe. 
 1967. Pop asleep in a chair, with fireworks tied round it that Dick and Harry have put on. Dick & Harry have their fingers in their ears.
 1968. The Beezer characters in a hot air balloon. Little Mo drops a bag of flour out, Colonel Blink looks through a telescope with a seagull on the end, Ginger blows bubbles out of a pipe.
 1969. Ginger using a plank of wood on a wall as a see-saw, with a snowball on the end of it.
 1970. Colonel Blink covered in snowballs and scolding at a snowman, Ginger is behind the snowman making snowballs.
 1971. Colonel Blink skiing down the snow.
 1972. Dick and Harry throwing rings at a sleeping Pop
 1973. Ginger making snowmen versions of Pop, Colonel Blink & Baby Crockett.
 1974. The Beezer characters on a sledge, Colonel Blink is standing near a bus stop watching the characters.
 1975. Dick and Harry dressed as Indians, with Pop tied up on a chair and Dick and Harry tickling his feet with feathers. 
 1976. Dick and Harry riding on Pop's back and holding an ice cream on a stick above Pop's head.
 1977. Dick, Harry and a dog riding on a cart, using Pop's shirt as a sail. Pop is running after them and Little Mo and Ginger are watching them over a fence.
 1978. Pop being floated by balloons about to land on a picnic, that the Beezer characters are having.
 1979. Pop carrying some heavy rucksacks, Dick and Harry are riding on him. 
 1980. Pop playing football with the other Beezer characters, he pushes Harry over.
 1981. Pop lying down asleep near a tree, Dick and Harry use his stomach as a see-saw.
 1982. The Beezer characters having tea, Ginger laughs at The Numbskulls using a slice of cheese as a slide.
 1983. The Beezer characters coming down with parachutes, Colonel Blink uses an umbrella. 
 1984. Colonel Blink is about to take a photo of the Beezer character, when he's about to knock over a beehive and Baby Crockett runs up to warn him.
 1985. Pop playing 'pin the tail on the donkey', with a blind fold on. He's about to trip over Fatty (Banana Bunch) who's bending down for a piece of cheese.
 1986. The Beezer characters in a band. Colonel Blink uses a teapot as a trumpet and The Numbskulls are holding their ears.
 1987. The characters going down a slide, Pop is about to squash one of The Numbskulls.
 1988. The characters on a horse.
 1989. The characters running an obstacle race, Colonel Blink is running on a wall, Little Mo have fallen in some water.
 1990. The characters on top of each other making a pyramid. 
 1991. Colonel Blink feeding the characters (dressed as penguins) with fish.
 1992. The characters playing Aladdin in a cave.
 1993. The characters building a snowman, Baby Crockett warns the others that Colonel Blink (on a sledge) is coming behind them.
 1994. Four of the characters heads surrounding Sting.
 1995. The characters on a yacht with Sting's face on the sail in the snow. Colonel Blink is holding an ear trumpet near his ear. 
 1996. A jigsaw puzzle with Geezer, Little Mo, Colonel Blink, Sting and Baby Crockett on.
 1997. Our Man (The Numbskulls) taking a photo of the other Beezer characters.
 1998. The characters making snowmen.
 1999. Ginger skiing on the snow, Sting, Baby Crockett and Little Mo run off scared and Colonel Blink is wearing summer clothes and sandals on a deckchair under some ice.
 2000. The characters in a boat, Baby Crockett and Little Mo are rowing, Ginger has a fishing rod, Geezer is looking through a telescope and Colonel Blink is reading a map on the wrong side, with a seagull on his head.
 2001. Pop dressed as Father Christmas giving other characters presents. Ginger a spaceship, Little Mo a giant teddy, Baby Crockett a robot, Sting a toy rabbit and Brainy (Banana Bunch) a TV.
 2002. The Banana Bunch watching Baby Crockett putting decorations on a Christmas tree, with the characters faces on the baubles and Little Mo as an angel on top of the tree.
 2003. Fatty (Banana Bunch) riding a bicycle with some of the characters standing on his back.

See also
List of DC Thomson publications

DC Thomson Comics titles
Comics anthologies
Publications established in 1957